Bettie Runnels (fl. 1897) was Louisiana's first female lawyer.

She was born in Texas and moved to Louisiana in childhood. Her grandfather, Hiram Runnels, was the former governor of Mississippi.

Runnels' first exposure to the legal field was working as a stenographer for the law firm Dinkelspiel & Hart. When the state law was revised in 1894 to allow women to study law, medicine and pharmacy, Runnels enrolled as the first female student in the law department of Tulane University in 1897 and graduated a year later. In the same year, Runnels became the first female registered to practice law in Louisiana.

See also 

 List of first women lawyers and judges in Louisiana

References 

Year of birth missing
Year of death missing
Louisiana lawyers
19th-century American women lawyers
Tulane University Law School alumni
19th-century American lawyers